An All-4-One Christmas is the third studio album and first Christmas album by All-4-One, released on October 10, 1995 by Atlantic Records and WEA.

Track listing
"Silent Night" (Traditional, arr. Rick Kellis) – 2:50
"This Christmas" (Donny Hathaway, Nadine Mckinnor) – 5:22
"The First Noel" (Traditional, arr. Rick Kellis) – 4:07
"The Christmas Song (Chestnuts Roasting on an Open Fire)" (Mel Tormé, Robert Wells) – 4:06
"Santa Claus Is Coming to Town" (Haven Gillespie, J. Fred Coots) – 4:07
"Mary's Little Boy Child" (Jester Hairston) – 4:30
"What Child Is This? (Greensleeves)" (Traditional, arr. Carl Wurtz) – 4:30
"Rudolph the Red-Nosed Reindeer/Frosty the Snowman" (Johnny Marks/Jack Rollins, Steve Nelson) – 4:06
"O Come All Ye Faithful" (Traditional, arr. Rick Kellis) – 3:30
"When You Wish Upon a Star" (Leigh Harline, Ned Washington) – 3:29
"Christmas with My Baby" (James Guillory, Jamie Jones) – 4:23
"We Wish You a Merry Christmas" (Traditional, arr. Rick Kellis) – 2:09

References

1995 Christmas albums
Atlantic Records albums
All-4-One albums
Christmas albums by American artists
Contemporary R&B Christmas albums